Archil Konstantinovich Jorjadze (January 10, 1872, Tiflis - March 21, 1913, Batumi) was a Georgian politician, one of the founders and the main ideologist of the Georgian Socialist-Federalist Revolutionary Party.

Biography

Jorjadze lived in England in a Tolstoyan colony. He collaborated in the journal Northern Herald, published under the pseudonym A. Sabuisky.

Works
ზ. ბაბუნაშვილი, თ. ნოზაძე, «მამულიშვილთა სავანე», გვ. 431, თბ., 1994

References

1872 births
1913 deaths
Anarchists from Georgia (country)
Politicians from Georgia (country)
Burials at Didube Pantheon